Sunny Blues is the first studio album of the South Korean girl group Sunny Hill. It was released in two parts with Part A being released on August 21, 2014 and Part B released on January 29, 2015.

Background
A teaser image was released on August 11, featuring the members (without their heads). On August 12, teaser images for Seungah and Kota were released. On August 13, teaser images for Misung and Jubi were released. On August 15, teaser images for the group and members were released alongside a medley of the album songs. On August 18, teaser video for "Monday Blues" was released. On August 21, full MV and Part A of the album were released.

Music video
The music video has a "secretary concept" with the message of "freedom at work".

Promotions
The promotions for the album started on August 21.

Track listing

Charts

Single chart

Release history

References

2014 debut albums
Dance-pop albums by South Korean artists
Korean-language songs
Kakao M albums